Stuttgart Observatory (025) is an astronomical observatory owned and operated by the association Schwäbische Sternwarte e.V. It is located on the Uhlandshöhe in Stuttgart, Germany. Public tours have been held since 1920 and the observatory claims to be one of the oldest in Germany.

History 

On the Initiative of the astronomer and author Robert Henseling, the astronomic association Schwäbische Sternwarte e.V. was founded in 1919. The purposes for the newfound association were, and still are, to spread and explain astronomical knowledge to a broad public and to provide support for the Planetarium Stuttgart.

To gather enough monetary funds for the construction of the Observatory at the site it still is today, even such famous guest speakers as Albert Einstein followed the invitation to give a speech about astronomy and donate the revenue to the Schwäbische Sternwarte e.V.. The construction of the observatory, designed by Wilhelm Jost, took place in 1921. Already in early January 1922 the association started operations at the new observatory. During World War II, all activities at the observatory were suspended, only to be resumed in September 1947.

Instruments 

The observatory is equipped with six telescopes, four of which are permanently mounted. The two others may be assembled if necessary.

Inside the bigger of the observatory's two astrodomes, the oldest of the six telescopes is attached to a mount reaching down to the bottom of the tower. This device is a 7-inch Zeiss telescope with 2.59-metre focal-length from 1911, one of the last still existent.

Another 7-inch refractor of newer design, a special H-alpha telescope and a 16-inch Newtonian telescope are located in separate sheds on the terrace between the two astrodomes. 
The latter telescope is frequently used by the members of the association for their scientific research –  predominantly the observation of star occultations by minor planets. The results are sent to a Japanese institute. For observations made by the Stuttgart Observatory concerning occultations, the observatory code given by the Minor Planet Center is 025.

See also 
 List of astronomical observatories

References

External links 
 Stuttgart Observatory

Astronomical observatories in Germany
Buildings and structures in Stuttgart
Tourist attractions in Stuttgart